The Cephalonia Prefecture was a prefecture in Greece, containing the Ionian islands of Cephalonia and Ithaca. In 2011 the prefectural self-government was abolished and the territory is now covered by the regional units of Cephalonia and Ithaca.

Provinces
It was previously divided into 3 eparchies (provinces), and one independent municipality, Ithaca:
 Krani Province - Argostoli
 Paliki Province - Lixouri
 Sami Province - Sami

Municipalities
The prefecture was divided into eight municipalities and one community:
Argostoli
Eleios-Pronnoi
Erisos
Ithaca
Leivathos
Paliki
Pylaros
Sami
Omala (Community)
All of the preceding are on the Cephalonia island, except Ithaca, which is on its own island of the same name.

See also
Cephalonia (constituency)

External links
 Official website

Prefectures of Greece
Geography of the Ionian Islands (region)
History of Cephalonia
Ithaca
1864 establishments in Greece
States and territories established in 1864
2010 disestablishments in Greece
States and territories disestablished in 2010